The World Heavyweight Championship was an American professional wrestling championship created and sanctioned by the California State Athletic Commission (CSAC). While the Commission sanctioned the title, it did not promote the events in which the Championship was defended. From 1929 until 1931, the American Wrestling Association (AWA) controlled the Championship. The AWA World Heavyweight Championship was recognized by the CSAC as the world championship until May 4, 1931, when the Commission refused to recognize Henri Deglane's victory over Ed "Strangler" Lewis in Montreal, Quebec, as the title had changed hands via disqualification rather than the traditional pinfall or submission. Lewis remained champion in California, and a separate lineage was created.

Background
The championship was subsequently controlled by a group of Los Angeles-based promoters collectively known as the "California Combine" (Cal and Aileen Eaton, Hugh Nichols, Johnny Doyle, and Mike Hirsch). At various times in the mid-1930s, the title was unified with the NYSAC World Heavyweight Championship. Wrestlers who held both the New York and California versions – Dave Levin, Dean Detton, Bronko Nagurski and Jim Londos – were recognized by The Ring magazine as the "true world champion".

On October 12, 1935, Vincent Lopez defended the title against Man Mountain Dean at the Plaza Mexico in Mexico City, Mexico. The event, hosted by the newly established Empresa Mexicana de Lucha Libre (EMLL), was seen by a record 35,000 people. It is the highest drawing show in EMLL's history, and held the all-time attendance record in lucha libre for nearly 20 years.

In 1949, the California Combine joined the National Wrestling Alliance, and the championship became the main singles title for the NWA's Los Angeles wrestling territory. On May 21, 1952, Lou Thesz defeated Baron Michele Leone to unify the Los Angeles-version of the World Heavyweight Championship with the NWA World Heavyweight Championship, the principal championship recognized by the National Wrestling Alliance. With 25,256 fans present, it was the most attended show of the 1950s and the first-ever $100,000 gate in professional wrestling history. According to Pro Wrestling Illustrated, Thesz's victory over Leone had made him the closest any wrestler had gotten in the last half century to establishing an undisputed world championship in pro wrestling.

On July 24, 1957, Thesz defeated Édouard Carpentier in Montreal under controversial circumstances to win the NWA World Heavyweight Championship. The decision was challenged by several members of the NWA who continued to recognize Carpentier as World Heavyweight Champion. Several splinter titles were eventually created as a result. The Eatons decided to leave the NWA in October 1959 to promote their own world title under the North American Wrestling Alliance banner with Carpentier as their inaugural champion. The NWA-sanctioned championship was abandoned and replaced by the NAWA World Heavyweight Championship.

Title history

Names

Reigns

Bibliography

References

External links
 World Heavyweight Championship (Los Angeles version) at Cagematch.net
 World Heavyweight Championship (Los Angeles version) at Johnny O's Wrestling Website
 World Heavyweight Championship (Los Angeles version) at Wrestlingdata.com

World heavyweight wrestling championships
Professional wrestling in California